18th meridian may refer to:

18th meridian east, a line of longitude east of the Greenwich Meridian
18th meridian west, a line of longitude west of the Greenwich Meridian